Niederholzklau is a constituent community of Freudenberg, Siegen-Wittgenstein, North Rhine-Westphalia, Germany.

Niederholzklau was first mentioned in 1256. Until December 31, 1968, the village belonged as an independent municipality to the Amt Freudenberg. On 1 January 1969 Niederholzklau was renamed a district of the city of Freudenberg.

It borders the Freudenberg districts of Oberholzklau and Alchen and the Siegen district of Langenholdinghausen.

Demographics
Niederholzklau has 189 inhabitants and is therefore the second smallest district of Freudenberg after Mausbach.

References

External links
 Niederholzklau in the Kulturatlas Westfalen
 Historical pictures of Niederholzklau

Former municipalities in North Rhine-Westphalia
Siegen-Wittgenstein